Agenda is a literary journal published in London and founded by William Cookson. Agenda Editions is an imprint of the journal operating as a small press.

History and editorial orientation
Agenda was started in 1959, after Cookson had met Ezra Pound in Italy the previous year. Pound had originally suggested that Cookson edit pages in an existing publication, but when these plans did not come to fruition, the bookseller and poet Peter Russell suggested that Cookson found his own magazine.  Agenda was edited with Peter Dale and then Patricia McCarthy, who continues to edit the journal following Cookson's death in 2003.

The editorial preoccupations of Agenda reflected Cookson's own passions. The journal continued to champion Pound long after the poet's death. A "Special Issue in Honour of Ezra Pound's Eighty-Fifth Birthday" (Vol. 8, Nos. 3–4) was a significant early issue of the journal in 1970, and a special issue on "Dante, Ezra Pound and Contemporary Poetry" (Vol. 34, Nos. 3–4) was published as late as 1996.

Cookson also used Agenda to promote the reputation of David Jones, devoting two major special issues to him (in 1967 and 1974) in addition to articles in several other issues. Agenda Editions published several major Jones volumes. These included The Kensington Mass (1975, published with a photographic reproduction of the manuscript) and The Roman Quarry (1981), a full-length volume of until then unpublished material. Agenda Editions published volumes of Jones's letters in 1979 and 1996.

Agenda is also notable for its focus upon the art of translation. Recent issues include "Translation as Metamorphosis" in 2005 (Vol. 4, No. 4).

Agenda: An Anthology 1959-1993 (1994)

Poets, translators and reviewers included were:

Michael Alexander
W. H. Auden
Jonathan Barker
John Bayley
William Bedford
Anne Beresford
Heather Buck
Basil Bunting
Stanley Burnshaw
John Cayley
Humphrey Clucas
William Cookson
Arthur Cooper
Peter Dale
Donald Davie
Peter Dent
Ronald Duncan
T. S. Eliot
Thom Gunn
Donald Hall
Michael Hamburger
Ian Hamilton
Seamus Heaney
David Heidenstam
A. L. Hendriks
Geoffrey Hill
Peter Jay
Roland John
David Jones
Peter Levi
Saunders Lewis
Eddie Linden
Edward Lowbury
Robert Lowell
Patricia McCarthy
Hugh MacDiarmid 
Seán Mac Falls
Jean MacVean
Eve Machin
Sylvia Mann
Virginia Maskell
Alan Massey
Ruth Mead
Matthew Mead
Moelwyn Merchant
W. S. Milne
Marianne Moore
George Oppen
Alan Neame
Pénélope Palmer
Rachel Pelham Burn
Stuart Piggott 
Ezra Pound
Kathleen Raine
Norman Rea
Theodore Roethke
David Rokeah
Peter Russell
N. K. Sandars
Tom Scott
C. H. Sisson
W. D. Snodgrass
Henry Swabey
R. S. Thomas
Charles Tomlinson
Peter Whigham
Julie Whitby
William Carlos Williams
Caroline Wright
Louis Zukofsky

References

External links
 

Literary magazines published in the United Kingdom
Quarterly magazines published in the United Kingdom
Magazines published in London
Magazines established in 1959
Poetry magazines published in the United Kingdom